is a former Japanese football player.

Playing career
Aono was born in Saijo on September 19, 1979. After graduating from Kwansei Gakuin University, he joined the J1 League club Gamba Osaka in 2002. However he did not play in any games over two seasons. Although he moved to Vissel Kobe in 2004, he still did not play.  In 2005, he moved to Albirex Niigata. He played often in 2005. However he did not play as much in 2006. In 2007, he moved to the J2 League club Ehime FC, the counterpart to the youth team he played for. He played often over three seasons. He retired at the end of the 2009 season.

Club statistics

References

External links

jsgoal.jp

1979 births
Living people
Kwansei Gakuin University alumni
Association football people from Ehime Prefecture
Japanese footballers
J1 League players
J2 League players
Gamba Osaka players
Vissel Kobe players
Albirex Niigata players
Ehime FC players
Association football midfielders